The 1936 National League Division One was the eighth season of the highest tier of motorcycle speedway in Great Britain.

Summary
The entrants were the same seven teams as the previous season.  Harringay's Jack Parker topped the rider averages but was injured for the inaugural World Championship Final won by Wembley's Lionel van Praag on his home track.

Belle Vue Aces won their fourth consecutive national title and Knockout Cup and third treble after winning the A.C.U Cup.

Final table

Top Ten Riders

National Trophy
The 1936 National Trophy was the sixth edition of the Knockout Cup.

Qualifying rounds
Southampton Saints won the Provincial final and therefore secured a place in the quarter finals.

Quarterfinals

Semifinals

Final

First leg

Second leg

Belle Vue were National Trophy Champions, winning on aggregate 122-90.

A.C.U Cup
The 1936 Auto-Cycle Union Cup was the third edition of the Cup and was won by Belle Vue for the third time. Tragically Herbert 'Dusty' Haigh was killed instantly after suffering a facrtured skull riding at Hackney Wick Stadium on 15 May 1936, in the ACU Cup match between Hackney and West Ham. He fell when in front and heading for a fourth consecutive heat win and the riders behind were unable to avoid him.

First round
Group 1

Group 2

Final

See also
List of United Kingdom Speedway League Champions
Knockout Cup (speedway)

References

Speedway National League
1936 in speedway
1936 in British motorsport